This is a list of years in Slovakia.

18th century

19th century

20th century

21st century

See also
List of years
List of years by topic

Years in Slovakia
Slovakia history-related lists
Slovakia